Blue Wizard Digital is a Canadian video game development studio and game publisher founded in 2014 by Jason Kapalka, one of the founders of PopCap Games and an early pioneer in the mobile casual gaming space. It is based in the Comox Valley, British Columbia, and is the only video game studio currently headquartered in Comox, as The Long Dark studio Hinterland is now based in Vancouver.

The studio specializes in campy horror puzzle games, humorous first-person shooters and other innovative variations on existing models of gaming.

Popular games

Shell Shockers 
Blue Wizard's most popular game as of October 2020 is Shell Shockers, a browser-based first-person shooter in which players take the form of eggs and "splat" each other. Players can drop in and play anonymously in public lobbies or create persistent accounts and private maps to play with friends, and the game features a variety of pop-culture-influenced, punnishly-named weapons (EggK-47(based on AK-47), Scrambler (based on shotgun), Free Ranger (based on SVD), Rpegg (based on RPG-7), Whipper (based on FN P90), Crackshot (based on M24), Tri-Hard (based on Steyr Aug)) player skins and items.

As of mid-2019, the game had almost 40 million players worldwide, and is one of the most popular .io games available online.

Shell Shockers has been the target of some controversy, as it is commonly played by school students on Chromebooks provided by schools for educational purposes. Some of the gaming platforms offering the browser-based game, such as CrazyGames, have therefore been blocked by American schools.

Slayaway Camp 
"A puzzle game for people who hate puzzle games," Slayaway Camp is set at a summer camp that's been set upon by a serial killer. Its blocky chibi-like style of character art makes it "adorably gruesome" and perhaps more palatable for those who would otherwise shy away from a horror game. Originally released in 2016 for PC, its success led to a console port of the game in 2017, with releases for Xbox One and PS4.

Kapalka has stated that one of his intentions in running Blue Wizard is to "find a way to make... puzzle games less boring, more viscerally exciting," and both Slayaway Camp and Friday the 13th: Killer Puzzle, another popular Blue Wizard camp-horror game, serve this goal.

Friday the 13th: Killer Puzzle 

Blue Wizard's only license-based game thus far, F13 is based on the popular Friday the 13th franchise and, similar to Slayaway Camp, has been called "adorable and violent"; its gameplay is also based largely on the sliding-block puzzle genre of game that founder Jason Kapalka helped to invent with Bejeweled.

References

External links 
 

Video game development companies
Video game companies of Canada
Video game companies established in 2014
Companies based in British Columbia
2014 establishments in British Columbia